William Reid was a Scottish businessman who emigrated to the U.S. state of Oregon in 1874 to establish the Oregonian Railway. He made several extensions to the railroad in the western Willamette Valley. The city of Dundee, Oregon was named after Dundee, where Reid had previously lived.

References 

Businesspeople from Oregon
History of transportation in Oregon
1842 births
Year of death missing
Scottish emigrants to the United States
People from Dundee
People from Dundee, Oregon
Businesspeople from Glasgow
19th-century Scottish businesspeople
19th-century American businesspeople
Businesspeople from Dundee